In Bahrain, both the Gregorian and Islamic calendars are used in government transactions. Short dates are written in "Day/month/year" from; when writing in Arabic and English:

 For Gregorian calendar:  or 16/12/2013.

 For Islamic calendar: 

 Long dates start with day, followed by month and ended with year:

 For Gregorian calendar:  or 16/Dec/2013.

 For Islamic calendar:

Time

Official time is indicated with the 12-hour clock system; however, a 24-hour clock system is also used. Bahrain is in the Asian time zone AST – UTC+03:00 Arabia standard time.

Time in Bahrain
Bahrain